Derek Jinks is an American lawyer, currently the Marrs McLean Professor at University of Texas School of Law and also previously the Charles H. Stockton Professor at Naval War College.

References

Year of birth missing (living people)
Living people
University of Texas at Austin faculty
American lawyers